Zadadrina is a genus of moths in the subfamily Arctiinae. It contains the single species Zadadrina metallica, which is found in the Democratic Republic of the Congo and South Africa.

References

Lithosiini